Trachydrillia denizi is a species of sea snail, a marine gastropod mollusk in the family Clavatulidae.

Description

Distribution
This marine species occurs off Senegal.

References

 Nolf F. & Swinnen F. (2010) A new genus and species of "Drillia-like" turrids (Mollusca: Gastropoda: Drilliidae) from Senegal. Neptunea 9(4): 17–22

External links

denizi
Gastropods described in 2010